Evius albicoxae is a moth of the family Erebidae. It was described by William Schaus in 1905. It is found in French Guiana and Peru.

References

Phaegopterina
Moths of South America
Moths described in 1905